The following highways are numbered 689:

United States